NVC community H2 (Calluna vulgaris - Ulex minor heath) is one of the heath communities in the British National Vegetation Classification system. It is one of five communities categorised as lowland dry heaths.

It has a localised distribution in southern England. There are three subcommunities.

Community composition

The following constant species are found in this community:
 Heather (Calluna vulgaris)
 Wavy Hair-grass (Deschampsia flexuosa)
 Bell Heather (Erica cinerea)
 Dwarf Gorse (Ulex minor)

Two rare species, Bristle Bent (Agrostis curtisii) and Hairy Greenweed (Genista pilosa), are associated with the community.

Distribution

This community is confined to southern England, from Dorset to Surrey and Kent, with the greatest concentrations occurring in the New Forest, Hampshire.

Subcommunities

There are three subcommunities:
 the so-called typical subcommunity
 the Vaccinium myrtillus subcommunity
 the Molinia caerulea subcommunity

References

 Rodwell, J. S. (1991) British Plant Communities Volume 2 - Mires and heaths  (hardback),  (paperback)

H02